Lake Carroll is a census-designated place (CDP) in Carroll County, Illinois, United States, surrounding a lake of the same name. It is in northeastern Carroll County and is bordered to the north by Stephenson County.

Lake Carroll was first listed as a CDP prior to the 2020 census. As of the 2020 census, the population was 852.

Geography 

Demographics
As of the 2020 census there were 852 people, 216 households, and 156 families residing in the CDP. The racial makeup of the CDP was 96.71% White, 0.23% African American, 0.23% Native American, 0.35% Asian, 0.12% Pacific Islander, 0.59% from other races, and 1.76% from two or more races. Hispanic or Latino of any race were 1.06% of the population.

There were 216 households, out of which 47.22% had children under the age of 18 living with them, 68.06% were married couples living together, 0.00% had a female householder with no husband present, and 27.78% were non-families. 24.07% of all households were made up of individuals, and 16.20% had someone living alone who was 65 years of age or older. The average household size was 2.69 and the average family size was 2.31.

The CDP's age distribution consisted of 20.4% under the age of 18, 0.0% from 18 to 24, 3.2% from 25 to 44, 21.4% from 45 to 64, and 55.0% who were 65 years of age or older. The median age was 66.4 years. For every 100 females, there were 83.8 males. For every 100 females age 18 and over, there were 99.0 males.

The median income for a household in the CDP was $84,048, and the median income for a family was $85,938. Males had a median income of $76,250 versus $40,962 for females. The per capita income for the CDP was $38,274. About 0.0% of families and 4.4% of the population were below the poverty line, including 0.0% of those under age 18 and 0.0% of those age 65 or over.

References

External links
Lake Carroll Association

Census-designated places in Carroll County, Illinois
Census-designated places in Illinois